List of the public buses in Jerusalem, Israel.

The public buses are run by three operators, Egged, Superbus and Extra Public Transportation.

Night lines
During the summer months (July and August), the night lines run every night except Friday night, due to Shabbat. Throughout the year, these lines run only on Thursday and Saturday. Official Egged website page about night lines

See also
Transportation in Israel

References 

Bus transport in Israel
Transport in Jerusalem
Jerusalem-related lists